South of Reality is the second studio album by The Claypool Lennon Delirium consisting of American multi-instrumentalists Sean Lennon and Primus' Les Claypool, released on February 22, 2019.

Background
The album was preceded by the lead single and music video for "Blood and Rockets," followed by two successive prerelease tracks: "Easily Charmed by Fools" in late 2018, and "Amethyst Realm" in early 2019.

Reception

The album received generally positive reviews from music critics, with a rating of 78 based on 7 reviews at Metacritic, surpassing the score of 70 received by their debut LP, Monolith of Phobos. Critics praised the album's unusual sound and improvement from their debut project: Paste magazine awarded the album an 8.5/10, writing "South of Reality is weird. It’s unorthodox... That's what makes the album so damn great." AllMusic noted that "If the duo's satire sometimes seems cheap—the Tinder jibes on 'Easily Charmed by Fools' are a little too easy—they make up for it through sheer good humor, which is why the playfulness of South of Reality charms instead of alienates." Uncut called the album "A meaty maximalist feast, richer and riper than its predecessor."

Track listing

Personnel
Les Claypool – vocals, all instruments, songwriter, engineer, mixing, producer
Sean Lennon – vocals, all instruments, songwriter, producer
Paulo Baldi – drums (on “Boriska”, “Amethyst Realm”, “Ask Your Doctor”)
Adam Gates – voices (in “Psyde Effects”)
Josh Adam Meyers – voices (in “Psyde Effects”)
Agent Ogden – design, layout
Jay Blakesberg – photography
Stephen Marcussen – mastering
Hisaki Yasuda – cover art

Credits adapted from AllMusic.

Tour

Tour dates 
The duo began their headlining tour in support of the album in December 2018. It ended on May 2, 2019, in New Orleans, Louisiana.

Charts

References

2019 albums
Sean Lennon albums
Les Claypool albums
ATO Records albums